Mohon Lal Ghosh (born 21 June 1944) is an Indian weightlifter. He competed at the 1964 Summer Olympics and the 1968 Summer Olympics.

References

External links
 

1944 births
Living people
Indian male weightlifters
Olympic weightlifters of India
Weightlifters at the 1964 Summer Olympics
Weightlifters at the 1968 Summer Olympics
Place of birth missing (living people)
Weightlifters at the 1966 Asian Games
Commonwealth Games medallists in weightlifting
Commonwealth Games silver medallists for India
Recipients of the Arjuna Award
Weightlifters at the 1966 British Empire and Commonwealth Games
Asian Games competitors for India
20th-century Indian people
Medallists at the 1966 British Empire and Commonwealth Games